was an old province in the area that today forms the eastern half of Aichi Prefecture. Mikawa bordered on Owari, Mino, Shinano, and Tōtōmi Provinces.

Mikawa is classified as one of the provinces of the Tōkaidō. Under the Engishiki classification system, Mikawa was ranked as a "superior country" (上国) and a "near country" (近国) in terms of its distance from the capital.

History
Mikawa is mentioned in records of the Taika Reform dated 645, as well as various Nara period chronicles, including the Kujiki, although the area has been settled since at least the Japanese Paleolithic period, as evidenced by numerous remains found by archaeologists. Although considered one administrative unit under the Engishiki classification system, this division (roughly based at the Yasaku River) persisted informally into the Edo period.

The exact location of the provincial capital is not known. Traditionally considered to have been located in the  area of the modern city of Toyokawa because of the place name, archaeological investigations at the Hakuho-machi area of Toyota from 1991 to 1997 have revealed extensive ruins and ceramic shards indicating the possibility that the provincial capital was located there. Furthermore, the ruins of the Kokubun-ji of Mikawa Province was located in 1999 a short distance away from the Toyota site. On the other hand, the Ichinomiya of the province, Toga jinja is located in what is now part of Toyokawa, as well as a temple which claims to be a successor to the original provincial temple.

During the Heian period, the province was divided into numerous shōen controlled by local samurai clans. During the Kamakura period but it came under the control of Adachi Morinaga, followed by the Ashikaga clan. For much of the Muromachi period it was controlled by the Isshiki clan. However, by the Sengoku period, the province had fragmented into many small territories largely dominated by the Matsudaira clan, and contested by the Imagawa clan to the east and the Oda clan to the west. It was united under Tokugawa Ieyasu after the power of the Imagawa had been destroyed at the Battle of Okehazama. After the creation of the Tokugawa shogunate, parts of the province were assigned as feudal domains to trusted hereditary retainers as fudai daimyōs, with large portions retained as tenryō territory administered by various hatamoto directly under the shogunate. During the Edo period, Mikawa was the only area permitted by the shogunate to produce gunpowder, which led to its modern fireworks industry.

The various domains and tenryō territories were transformed into short-lived prefectures in July 1871 by the abolition of the han system, and was organized into ten districts by the early Meiji period cadastral reform of 1869. The entire territory of former Mikawa Province became part of the new Aichi Prefecture in January 1872.

After World War II, the territory of former Mikawa Province prospers as the capital of the Japanese automobile industry.

Historical districts
 Aichi Prefecture
 Atsumi District (渥美郡) – dissolved
 Hazu District (幡豆郡) – dissolved
 Hekikai District (碧海郡) – dissolved
 Hoi District (宝飯郡) – dissolved
 Kamo District (加茂郡)
 Higashikamo District (東加茂郡) – dissolved
 Nishikamo District (西加茂郡) – dissolved
 Nukata District (額田郡)
 Shitara District (設楽郡)
 Kitashitara District (北設楽郡)
 Minamishitara District (南設楽郡) – dissolved

Domains in Mikawa Province

Sports
SeaHorses Mikawa and SAN-EN NeoPhoenix play in the B.League, Japan's first division of professional basketball.

References

Citations

Sources 

 Nussbaum, Louis-Frédéric and Käthe Roth. (2005).  Japan encyclopedia. Cambridge: Harvard University Press. ;  OCLC 58053128
 Papinot, Edmond. (1910). Historical and Geographic Dictionary of Japan. Tokyo: Librarie Sansaisha. OCLC 77691250

External links 

  Murdoch's map of provinces, 1903

 
History of Aichi Prefecture
Former provinces of Japan
1868 disestablishments in Japan
States and territories disestablished in 1868